Alina Raikova (born 14 August 1991) is a Kazakhstani biathlete. She competed at the Biathlon World Championships 2013, and at the 2014 Winter Olympics in Sochi, in the 15 km individual competition.

References

1991 births
Living people
Biathletes at the 2014 Winter Olympics
Biathletes at the 2018 Winter Olympics
Kazakhstani female biathletes
Olympic biathletes of Kazakhstan
Asian Games medalists in biathlon
Asian Games silver medalists for Kazakhstan
Asian Games bronze medalists for Kazakhstan
Biathletes at the 2017 Asian Winter Games
Medalists at the 2017 Asian Winter Games
Universiade medalists in biathlon
Universiade gold medalists for Kazakhstan
Competitors at the 2015 Winter Universiade